Baseball Chapel is an organization that provides Christian chaplains to professional baseball teams. It was founded by Watson Spoelstra in 1973. Before Watson founded Baseball Chapel, he was a sportswriter in Detroit. All of the major league organizations had a chapel program put in place by 1975, just two years after being founded. A few years later in 1978, Baseball chapel had decided to expand to minor league organizations and also decided to expand to Latin America. 30 years after being founded, Baseball Chapel had then decided to expand to Mexico. Then a year later in 2004 it would expand to Japan.  The organisation's activities have provoked controversy and have been criticized by members of other faiths. Baseball Chapel has expanded to every major league teams and to all minor league baseball teams. Because of the expansion, Baseball Chapel serves in more than 350 locations in both the United States and Canada. The four main people in charge of Baseball Chapel are Vince Nauss, Rob Crose, Luke Sawyer, and Steve Sisco.

References

External links
Official website
http://www.baseballchapel.org/documents/presentation.pdf
http://www.baseballchapel.org/index.cfm?Fuseaction=AboutUs

+
Baseball organizations
1973 establishments in the United States